James Hall (born James Suggs on October 1, 1971) is an American gospel musician, organist, and music producer. Known as the “Duke of Gospel”. He started his music career, in 1994, with the release of God Is in Control with Intersound Records, and this charted on the Billboard magazine Gospel Albums chart. Hall has released six more albums with various labels that have charted on the Gospel Albums chart, and these were with Worship & Praise, which is the name of his choir he founded. He released an album with Voices of Citadel in 2010, Won't It Be Wonderful, that charted on the Gospel Albums chart.

Early life
Hall was born James Suggs on October 1, 1971 in Brooklyn, New York, as the youngest sibling in an eight sibling household. He commenced singing at the age of five years, while he formed his choir, Worship & Praise, while he was in high school.

Music career
In 1987 he founded Worship & Praise, (WAP) his own gospel singing ensemble. In 1992, the opportunity to perform a five minute spot on TV’s Bobby Jones Gospel came.  It was just the break they had been looking for, as earlier that year WAP recorded their first project on the Tehilah Records label.

His music recording career began in 1994, with the release of two albums by Intersound Records, God Is in Control and King of Glory (1995), and those both placed on the Billboard magazine Gospel Albums chart at No. 10 and No. 12. The third album, According to James Hall, Chapter 3, was released on July 15, 1997 by CGI Records, and this placed at No. 8 on the aforementioned chart. He released, Live from New York at Lincoln Center, on July 7, 1998 by Platinum Entertainment, and this charted at No. 10 on the Gospel Albums chart. The next two albums, Messiah in 1998 released by A&M Records and 1999's We Celebrate Christmas with James Hall released by Compendia Music Group, yet they failed to chart. His next album, We Are at War, was released by Destiny Records on May 8, 2001, and this placed upon three Billboard magazine charts, the Gospel Albums at No. 7, Independent Albums at No. 24, and No. 39 on the Heatseekers Albums charts. On August 8, 2006, he released Voices of Citadel on his own label Music Blend Records, however it did not chart. The subsequent album, Live at Foxwoods, was released by Comin Atcha Music, Inc. on October 2, 2007, and this charted on the Gospel Albums at No. 19. While his next release was with Voices of Citadel, Won't It Be Wonderful, which this was released in 2010 by Music Blend, and this time around it charted on the Gospel Albums at No. 5, while it placed at No. 46 on the Heatseekers Albums. The album, Trip Down Memory Lane, was released in 2012 by Entertainment One Music, and it placed upon two Billboard charts, the Gospel Albums at No. 6 and No. 49 on the Independent Albums chart.

Discography
With Worship & Praise

With Voices of Citadel

References

1971 births
Living people
African-American songwriters
African-American Christians
Musicians from Brooklyn
Songwriters from New York (state)
MNRK Music Group artists
21st-century African-American people
20th-century African-American people